Abia State is a state in the South-East geopolitical zone of Nigeria, it is bordered to the north and northeast by the states of Enugu, and Ebonyi, Imo State to the west, Cross River State to the east, Akwa Ibom State to the southeast, and Rivers State to the south. It takes its name from the acronym for four of the state's most populated regions: Aba, Bende, Isuikwuato, and Afikpo (but Afikpo was later joined with a part of Enugu state to create Ebonyi state in 1996). The state capital is Umuahia while the largest city and commercial centre is Aba.

Abia is the 32nd largest in area and 27th most populous with an estimated population of over 3,720,000 as of 2016. Geographically, the state is divided between the Niger Delta swamp forests in the far south and the drier Cross–Niger transition forests with some savanna in the rest of the State. Other important geographical features are the Imo and Aba Rivers which flow along the Abia's western and southern borders, respectively.

Modern-day Abia State has been inhabited for years by various ethnic groups, but it is predominantly inhabited by the Igbo people. In the pre-colonial period, what is now Abia State was a part of Arochukwu-based Aro Confederacy before the confederacy was defeated in the early 1900s by British troops in the Anglo-Aro War. After the war, the British incorporated the area into the Southern Nigeria Protectorate which later merged into British Nigeria; after the merger, Abia became a centre of anti-colonial resistance with the Women's War that started in Oloko.

After independence in 1960, the Abia was a part of the post-independence Eastern Region until 1967 before the region was split and it became part of the East Central State. Less than two months afterwards, the former Eastern Region attempted to secede in the three-year long Nigerian Civil War with Abia as a part of the secessionist state of Biafra. At the war's end and for the reunification of Nigeria, the East Central State was merged as one until 1976 when Imo State](including now-Abia) was formed by the Murtala Muhammed regime. Fifteen years afterwards, Imo State was divided with eastern Imo being broken off to form the old Abia State; but in 1996, part of Abia's northeast was removed to form a part of the new Ebonyi State.

Economically, Abia State is based around the production of crude oil and natural gas along with agriculture, mainly of yams, maize, taro, oil palm, and cassava. A key minor industry is manufacturing, especially in and around Aba. With its fast growing population and industrialization, Abia has the joint-eighth highest Human Development Index in the country.

Geography 

Abia State occupies about 6,320 square kilometres, it is bounded on the north and northeast by the states of Enugu, and Ebonyi. Imo State to the west, Cross River State and Akwa Ibom State to the east and south east respectively, and Rivers State to the south. The southernmost part of the State lies within the Niger Delta Swamp Forests, while the rest of the state, lies within the Cross–Niger transition forests. The most important rivers in Abia State are the Imo and Aba Rivers which flow into the Atlantic Ocean through Akwa Ibom State.

History and population 
Abia State is one of the thirty-six States in Nigeria, and has about  seventeen Local Government Areas, out of the 774 Local Government Areas that make up the Federal Republic of Nigeria. Abia State was created on the 27th of August 1991, during the government of General Ibrahim Babangida. The State is located in  the south-eastern part of Nigeria. Abia state was created out of Imo State, and the two sister states share boundaries. Abia State is known as  one of the constituent states of the Niger Delta region. The state has its capital at Umuahia while the commercial city of the state is Aba. Abia State is also referred to as God's own state. The name "Abia" is an abbreviation of four of Abia state's densely populated regions Aba, Bende, Isuikwuato, and Afikpo.

The Igbo people, who are one of the indigenous peoples of the South-eastern part of Nigeria, make up 95% of the population.  Their traditional language, Igbo, is in widespread use. English is also widely spoken, and serves as the official language in governance and business. In Abia State over 7  million people are mainly Christians.

Climate 
Aba experiences a warm and gloomy wet season as well as a scorching and oppressive dry season.

The beach/pool score indicates that the best time of year to visit Aba for hot-weather activities is from late November to early February.

Infrastructure and economy 
Crude oil and gas production is a prominent activity, as it contributes over 39%  of the State's GDP. However, the indigenous oil companies – through the Marginal Fields Programme (MFP) – have not found it easy to attract the requisite funding and infrastructural capacity, to explore some of the marginal oil fields which are about 50 in the State.

The manufacturing sector only accounts for 2% of the GDP. The industrial centre of the state is in Aba, with textile manufacturing, pharmaceuticals, soap, plastics, cement, footwear, and cosmetics. In addition to the above, Abia State Government has just built a 9,000 capacity multipurpose International Conference Centre in Umuahia. This edifice of international standard was built by Governor T.A Orji, to enhance tourism as well as boost the state economy, through hosting of major International and Local events.

Representing 27% of the GDP, agriculture – which employs 70% of the state workforce – is the second economic sector of Abia. With its adequate seasonal rainfall, Abia has much arable land that produces yams, maize, potatoes, rice, cashews, plantains, taro, and cassava. Oil palm is the most important cash crop.

Oil and gas exploration 
There are over 100 oil wells and 3 installed flow stations in Abia State. There is also an associated gas plant, Abia/NNPC gas plant. As of 2012, boundary Commission said it returned 42 oil wells from neighbouring Rivers State to Abia. This would have meant Abia being fourth largest oil-producing state in the country. Oil giant, Shell, holds most of the licenses for the wells in the State, and has concentrated on the estimated 50 wells that are considered high-yield.

The State produced 36,000 barrels of crude oil per day; "Imoturu produces 23,000 barrels per day and Isimili flow station produces over 8,000 barrels of crude oil per day. Then four oil wells in Izaku go to Obigo flow station. About 30 oil wells from my village go to Umuri, and about eight oil wells from Umurie go to Afam", lamented Samuel Okezie Nwogu, Chairman of Abia State Oil Producing Development Area Commission (ASOPADEC).However, the State has complained of poor funding from its oil revenue federal allocation.

Environmental Issues

Solid Waste 
Municipal solid waste management (MSWM) deals with the collection, storing, treatment and disposal of solid waste, to ensure that it does not affect humans, living things and the environment at large. There are factors that influences the Municipal solid waste generation such as income level, local climatic condition, urbanization and economic development. MSW in Aba, Abia State is classified into;

 Domestic waste (waste from households, food centers, markets, and commercial premises)
 Industrial waste (excluding toxic waste that requires special handling)
 Institutional waste (waste from government establishments, schools, hospitals and recreational facilities)

Aba 
The MSW (Municipal Solid Waste) for a very long time now, like many other cities and urban areas in Nigeria, has in its records reached appalling dimensions.

Due to the poor waste management, the attendant deaths and illnesses from diarrhoea, respiratory and

lung diseases, malaria, parasitic worms, typhoid fever, cholera, etc are on the rise. This has its own d in no small measures by poor MSW

management practices have implications on t.e social, political and economic development of the population

Raw Materials In Abia State 
 Gold
 Lead/Zinc
 Limestone
 Oil/gas
 Salt
 Kaolin
 Limestone

University and colleges 

There are six universities in the state: the federal-owned Michael Okpara University of Agriculture at Umudike, the state-owned Abia State University in Uturu, the privately-owned Gregory University in Uturu, Rhema University in Aba, Spiritan University in Umu Nneochi, and Clifford University in Owerrinta. Abia State College of Education (Technical) in Arochukwu, Abia State College Of Health Sciences and Management Technology in Aba, Temple Gate Polytechnic in Aba and Abia State Polytechnic are the other tertiary institutions in the State.

Transportation 
The nearest airport to Abia is Sam Mbakwe Cargo Airport (Owerri Airport), it is an hour drive to Umuahia and Aba. It is two hours drive to Port Harcourt International Airport. Akwa Ibom Airport (Akwa Ibom State) can also serve would-be visitors. The distance between Uyo (Akwa Ibom) and Umuahia (Abia) is: .

The rail transport is also available in the state very effective. Aba is connected to Port Harcourt by rail. Umuahia is connected to Aba and Enugu by rail. The coastal parts of the State are equally accessible using boats and canoes.

Languages 
Below is a list of Languages of Abia State organised  by there LGA:

Politics 
The State Government is led by a democratically elected Governor who works closely with members of the state's House of Assembly. The capital city of the state is Umuahia. and there are 17 local government areas in the state.

At statehood in 1991, Abia was ruled by Ibrahim Babangida-appointed Military Administrator Frank Ajobena before Ogbonnaya Onu was elected governor later that year under the Third Nigerian Republic. Onu governed for nearly two years before Sani Abacha ended the Third Republic and reinstated full military rule. Under the Abacha regime, three more Military Administrators (Chinyere Ike Nwosu, Temi Ejoor, and Moses Fasanya) were appointed before Abacha's death and the accession of Abdulsalami Abubakar. Abubakar appointed one more Military Administrator, Anthony Obi, before starting the transition to democracy in 1998.

In 1999, Nigeria returned to democracy, and Orji Uzor Kalu was elected governor on the platform of the People's Democratic Party. Consequently, he was sworn in on 29 May 1999. In 2003, when it was time for fresh elections, Kalu re-contested on the platform of the PDP and got a second mandate to govern (the Constitution of Nigeria limits Governors to two terms in office). At the end of Kalu's term in 2007, Theodore Orji (PPA) defeated Onyema Ugochukwu (PDP) in the 2007 gubernatorial election, to become Abia's next Governor. In 2011, Theodore Orji defected from the PPA to the PDP before being re-elected for another four-year term later that year.

In 2015, Okezie Ikpeazu (PDP) was voted in as the ninth Governor of Abia State. Four years later, he won re-election in 2019, defeating Uche Ogah of the All Progressives Congress and Alex Otti of APGA to be sworn in as Governor for a second term on 29 May 2019.

Electoral system 
The electoral  system of each state is selected using a modified two-round system. To be elected in the first round, a candidate must receive the plurality of the vote and over 25% of the vote in at least two -third of the State local government Areas. If no candidate passes threshold, a second round will be held between the top candidate and the next candidate to have received a plurality of votes in the highest number of local government Areas.

Local Government Areas 

Abia State is made up of seventeen (17) Local Government Areas. They are:

Aba North
Aba South
Arochukwu
Bende
Ikwuano
Isiala Ngwa North
Isiala Ngwa South
Isuikwuato
Obi Ngwa
Ohafia
Osisioma Ngwa
Ugwunagbo
Ukwa East
Ukwa West
Umuahia North
Umuahia South
Umu Nneochi

Traditional rulers

Culture and tourism 
Tourist destinations include:

 Arochukwu, which is associated with slave trade.
 Azumini Blue River waterside
 The Amakama wooden cave; a hollow tree that can accommodate up to twenty people.
 Caves located in the north, ranging from Umunneochi to Arochukwu.
  Traditional festivals and dances
 National War Museum, Umuahia and Ojukwu Bunker in Umuahia
 Museum of Colonial History in Aba
 Akwete” cloth weaving at Ukwa-East LGA
 Ohafia War Dancers
 AmaforIsingwu biannual Iza aha ceremony
 Ekpe Festival in Umuahia

Notable people 

 Abai Ikwechegh – Jurist
 Acho Nwakanma – Former Deputy Governor of Abia State
 Adaobi Tricia Nwaubani – novelist and essayist
 Adolphus Wabara – Former Senate President of Nigeria.
 Akwaeke Emezi – novelist
 Alex Mascot Ikwechegh, politician, businessman and philanthropist
 Alexx Ekubo, Nollywood actor and Top Model
 Alex Otti – Former Group Managing Director of Diamond Bank PLC.
 Alvan Ikoku, OBE educationist (1900–1971)
 Anya Oko Anya, technocrat and academic
 Ashley Nwosu – Former Nigerian Actor
 Arunma Oteh – Former World Bank Vice President and Treasurer.
 Azubuike Ihejirika – Lt. General and former Chief of Army Staff
 Azubuko Udah – Former Deputy-Inspector General of the Nigerian Police Force
 Basketmouth – comedian
 Benjamin Kalu – politician and member of the House of Representatives
 Blessing Nwagba – Female Politician
 Bright Chimezie – Highlife Musician
 Buchi Atuonwu – Gospel Artiste
 Chelsea Eze – award-winning Nollywood actress
 Chidi Imoh – Athlete
 Chijioke Nwakodo – Politician
 Chika Chukwumerije – Olympic Taekwondo Medalist (Beijing 2008); 3-time Olympian; first Black African Olympic Medalist in the Martial Arts.
 Chika Okeke-Agulu – Art historian.
 Chinedu Ikedieze – award-winning Nollywood actor,
 Chinedum Enyinnaya Orji – Speaker of the Abia State House of Assembly
 Chinweizu Ibekwe – Renowned essayist, poet, and journalist.
 Chinyere Almona – business executive
 Chinyere Kalu – Nigeria's first female pilot.
  Chioma Agomo – Professor of Law
  Chioma Onyekwere – Nigeria's Discus Champion.
 Chioma Toplis – Nollywood Actress.
 Chisom Chikatara – Professional Footballer
 Christy Ucheibe – Female Nigerian Professional Footballer
  Chuku Wachuku – Statesman and former Director-General of Nigeria's NDE: National Directorate of Employment
 Christopher Kanu – Former Nigerian Professional Footballer.
 Christopher Osondu – Former Navy Captain and Military Administrator of Cross River State
 Chukwuemeka Ngozichineke Wogu – Former Minister of Labour and Productivity
 Clifford Ohiagu – Politician
 Daniel Kanu – Nigerian-American Politician.
  Dike Chukwumerije – Award-winning Novelist, Poet, Public Speaker and Spoken-word artiste. Listed on 100 most influential Africans.
 Ebitu Ukiwe – former Military Vice President; Former Governor of Niger and Lagos States.
 Ejike Asiegbu- Nollywood Veteran actor
 Ejikeme Ikwunze – Sports Journalist
 Emma Ugolee – Media Personality and Author
 Emmanuel Acho – Former American Football Player; Analyst at Fox Sports 1
 Emeka Ananaba – Former Deputy Governor of Abia State
 Eni Njoku – pioneer Vice Chancellor, University of Lagos and first black Vice Chancellor, University of Nigeria Nsukka.
 Enyinnaya Abaribe – Senator and former Deputy Governor
 Eucharia Oluchi Nwaichi – Environmental biochemist, Soil Scientist, and Toxicologist
 Ezinne Kalu, Female Basketballer
 Eziuche Ubani – Female Politician
 Felix Nmecha – Professional Football Player
 Fortunatus Nwachukwu – Catholic Prelate
 Francis Ezeh – Professional Football Player
 Godswill Obioma – Former National Examination Council Registrar
 Ifu Ennada – Actress, Fashion Designer, and Former Big Brother Naija Housemate.
 Iheanacho Obioma – Politician
 IK Ogbonna, Nollywood Actor and Top Model
 Ike Ibeabuchi, Professional Boxer.
 Ike Nwachukwu, military officer, former state governor, diplomat, former senator and former chairman of the governing board of Nigerian Institute of International Affairs.
 Ikechi Uko- Renowned travel consultant
 Ikechukwu Uche – Former Nigerian Professional Footballer
 Ikeogu Oke – Author, Journalist, and Award-winning Poet
 Isaac Nwaobia – Anglican Bishop
 Ivy Uche Okoronkwo – First Female Deputy Inspector General of Police
 J. Martins, Afro-pop artiste
 Jaja Wachuku – First Minister of Foreign Affairs in Nigeria, First indigenous Speaker of the House of Representatives of Nigeria and first Nigerian Permanent representative to the UN.
 Joe Irukwu – Nigeria's First Professor of Insurance.
 Joel Kachi Benson, documentary film maker.
 John Godson – Polish lawmaker and philanthropist.
 Johnson Aguiyi-Ironsi – Nigeria's Military Officer and former Head of State.
 Josaiah Ndubuisi Wachuku – Former Eze of Ngwa land.
 Joyce Kalu – Nollywood Actress
 Kalu Uche – Former Nigerian Professional Footballer
 Kalu Idika Kalu – former Finance Minister and politician
 Kalu Ikeagwu – Movie Actor and Writer.
 Kalu Ndukwe Kalu – Political scientist and Distinguished Research Professor of Political Science and National Security Policy at Auburn University
 Kelechi Emeteole – Former Nigerian Professional Footballer
 Kenneth Omeruo – Nigerian Professional Footballer
 Larry Gaaga – Renowned Songwriter and Music Producer
 Linda Ejiofor – Nollywood Actress
 Lukas Nmecha – Professional Football Player
 Macebuh Chinonyerem – Former member of the Abia State House of Assembly
 Mao Ohuabunwa, industrialist and politician
 Mary Ikoku – Development Consultant
 Mary Lazarus – Nollywood Actress
 Martins Azubuike – Former Speaker of Abia State House of Assembly.
 Michael Okpara – premier of Nigeria's Eastern Region from 1959 to 1966
 Mike Ezuruonye – Award-winning Nollywood actor.
 Mr Raw – Igbo rap music pioneer
 Nathan Kanu – Anglican Bishop
 Ndubuisi Kanu – Former Governor of Lagos State and old Imo State.
Njoku Nnamdi – Former Member of the Abia State House of Assembly
Nkechi Blessing Sunday – Nollywood actress
Nkechi Justina Nwaogu – Two Time Senator Abia Central Senatorial District and Immediate Past Pro Chancellor University of Calabar.
 Nkiru Sylvanus – Awarding winning Nollywood actress
 Nnamdi Kanu – founder of the Indigenous People of Biafra (IPOB), a separatist group.
 Nnamdi Udoh – Aeronautical Engineer
 Ndubuisi Ekekwe – Notable Inventor
 Nnenna Elendu Ukeje – Female Politician
 Nwabueze Nwokolo – British Lawyer
 Nwakanwa Chimaobi – Former member of the Abia State House of Assembly
 Nwankwo Kanu – Two time African Footballer of the year and Arsenal FC legend.
 OC Ukeje – Lagos-based Multiple Award Winning Nollywood actor
 Ogbugo Kalu – Renowned Army Officer.
 Oji Umozurike, professor of law
 Ojo Maduekwe – Former Nigerian Politician.
 Okechukwu Enelamah – former Minister for Trade and Investment (2015–2019)
 Okezie Ikpeazu – Abia State Governor
 Olu Oguibe – Professor of art at the University of Connecticut and senior fellow at the Smithsonian Institution in Washington, DC
 Oluchi Onweagba – International model and first winner of M-Net Face of Africa
 Onwuka Kalu – Business Mogul and co-founder of Fidelity Union Merchant Bank
 Onyema Ogbuagu – Medical Researcher
 Onyema Ugochukwu – First Executive Chairman of the Niger Delta Development Commission(NDDC)
 Orji Uzor Kalu – chairman, SLOK Group; Former State Governor and one time Founder of Progressive People's Alliance (PPA); Senator of the Federal Republic of Nigeria
 Pascal Atuma – Canadian-Nigerian actor, screenwriter, film producer, director and CEO/Chairman TABIC Record Label. born in Ikwuano Umuahia, Abia State, Nigeria.
 Pascal Ojigwe – Nigerian former professional footballer and Abia State Commissioner of Sports.
 Paul Agbai Ogwuma – former Governor of Nigeria's Central Bank
 Ruggedman, Afro-Rap artiste.
 2Shotz, AfroRap Artiste
 Sam Acho – ESPN Sports Analyst and Veteran American Football Player.
 Sam Ohuabunwa – Founder of Neimeth Pharmaceutical and Former President of the Pharmaceutical Society of Nigeria
 Samuel Achilefu – Notable Inventor
 Samuel Chukwueze – Nigeria National Team football player
 Samuel Kalu – Nigerian Professional Footballer.
 Sunday Mba – Nigerian Professional Footballer
Theodore Orji – former State Governor and a serving Senator of the Federal Republic of Nigeria.
 Uche Jombo, award-winning Nollywood actress.

 Uche Chukwumerije – 3-time Senator of Fed Rep of Nigeria; Former Nigerian Minister of Information and Culture; Former Biafran Minister of Information; Publisher Afriscope Magazine.
 Uche Elendu – Nollywood actress
 Uche Okechukwu – former Nigerian Team footballer
 Uchechukwu Sampson Ogah – Businessman and Politician
 Uchenna Ikonne – Academic and Public Administrator
 Uchenna Kanu – Female Nigerian Professional Footballer
 Ude Oko Chukwu – Deputy Governor of Abia State
 Uma Ukpai – Evangelist.
 Uzo Asonye – Partner at Davis Polk & Wardwell
 Uzodinma Iweala –  US-based medical doctor and author of the book Beasts of No Nation.
 Uzoma Emenike- Nigeria's Ambassador to the United States of America.
 Victoria Inyama – Nollywood Actress.
 Vincent Eze Ogbulafor – Former National Chairman of the People's Democratic Party
 Waconzy – Musician
 Yagazie Emezi – Award-winning photojournalist
Yvonne Okoro – Ghanaian-Nigerian actress

References

External links 

ABIA State of Nigeria – A Profile
Abia State Background Information

Abia Union USA

 
States of Nigeria
States in Igboland
States and territories established in 1991
1991 establishments in Nigeria